is a Japanese football club based in Sendai, Miyagi Prefecture, Japan. That currently plays in the Japan Football League, Japanese fourth tier of football league. The team colour is navy.

History 
The club was founded by the workers of Sony's Sendai factory in 1968.  They kept a low profile playing mainly in the Miyagi Prefecture League for a long time.  However, it changed suddenly in 1993 when they embarked on a challenging task to reach the former Japan Football League within 5 years.  They became league champions for 4 consecutive seasons starting from 1994, first in the Prefecture League and the others in the Tōhoku Regional League.  They achieved their goal and were promoted to the JFL by winning the 1997 Regional League play-off.

When the J. League Division 2 was formed in 1999, the club decided not to turn professional.  They joined the newly organised Japan Football League instead and have been an established JFL side since then.

As a result of the 2011 Tōhoku earthquake and tsunami, Sony Sendai, with permission from the JFL, did not contest the first half of the 2011 season. They expectedly earned last place on points, but due to Machida Zelvia and Matsumoto Yamaga being promoted to Division 2 and JEF Reserves withdrawing from the competition, they were spared relegation.

In 2015 Sony Sendai won the second stage and earned its first JFL title by defeating first stage champions Vanraure Hachinohe on penalties after a tied two-leg final on aggregate.

League and cup record 

Key

Current squad 
As of 9 March 2023.

Coaching Staff

Managerial history

References

External links 
  Official Website
  Facebook's page

 
Football clubs in Japan
Association football clubs established in 1967
Sports teams in Sendai
1967 establishments in Japan
Japan Football League (1992–1998) clubs
Japan Football League clubs
Works association football clubs in Japan